Matt Reid and John-Patrick Smith were the defending champions but Smith decided not to participate.
Reid played alongside Carsten Ball and won the title, defeating Radu Albot and Matthew Ebden, 7–5, 6–4.

Seeds

Draw

References
 Main Draw

McDonald's Burnie International - Doubles
Burnie International